Sieraków is a town in Greater Poland Voivodeship (west-central Poland).

Sieraków may also refer to:

Sieraków, Lesser Poland Voivodeship (south Poland)
Sieraków, Łódź Voivodeship (central Poland)
Sieraków, Świętokrzyskie Voivodeship (south-central Poland)
Sieraków, Subcarpathian Voivodeship (south-east Poland)
Sieraków, Gostynin County in Masovian Voivodeship (east-central Poland)
Sieraków, Warsaw West County in Masovian Voivodeship (east-central Poland)
Sieraków, Wołomin County in Masovian Voivodeship (east-central Poland)
Sieraków, Silesian Voivodeship (south Poland)
Sieraków, Lubusz Voivodeship (west Poland)

See also
Sierakowo (disambiguation)
Sierakowski